Quarto was a unique protected cruiser built by the Italian Regia Marina (Royal Navy) in the 1910s. Her keel was laid in November 1909, she was launched in August 1911, and was completed in March 1913. Her high speed was a requirement for the role in which she was designed to serve: a scout for the main Italian fleet.

Quarto was based at Brindisi during World War I; she saw action once, during an attack by the Austro-Hungarian Navy on transports operating in the southern Adriatic. She engaged the Austro-Hungarian cruiser  but neither ship was damaged and both sides withdrew. Quarto served briefly in East Asian waters in the early 1930s, and supported Italian forces during the Second Italo-Abyssinian War in 1936. The following year she served as the flagship of the Italian forces participating in the non-intervention patrols during the Spanish Civil War; here she was attacked by Republican bombers, although she escaped damage. She was stricken from the naval register in January 1939 and subsequently used in weapons tests with human torpedoes and explosive motorboats. Quarto was sunk in a test with an MT explosive motorboat in November 1940.

Design
Quarto was designed by Lieutenant Commander Giulio Truccone, and was intended to serve as a scout for the main fleet. As such, she was equipped with steam turbines, which produced higher speeds than the older triple-expansion steam engines used on earlier cruisers. She was the first Italian cruiser so equipped.

General characteristics and machinery

Quarto had a minimal superstructure, consisting of a main conning tower forward and a small, secondary conning tower further aft. The ship was fitted with a pair of pole masts at the main and rear conning towers, the masts carrying spotting tops. She had a short forecastle deck for the first third of the ship, stepping down to the main deck just aft of the forward conning tower. She had a crew of 13 officers and 234 enlisted men.

The ship's propulsion system consisted of a four Parsons steam turbines, each driving a single screw propeller, with steam supplied by eight oil-fired and two coal-and-oil-fired Blechynden water-tube boilers. The boilers were trunked into three closely spaced funnels amidships.

Armament and armor
Quarto was armed with a main battery of six  L/50 guns mounted singly; two were placed side by side on the forecastle, two on the main deck further aft, and two on the upper deck astern of the rear conning tower. These last two guns were slightly offset, with the port gun further aft. A secondary battery of six  L/50 guns, the same Pattern ZZI type guns used on the Italian dreadnoughts, provided close range defense against torpedo boats. These were placed abreast the funnels, three on either side of the ship. She was also armed with two  torpedo tubes in deck-mounted launchers, though shortly after her commissioning, these were replaced with submerged tubes. Quarto was designed to carry 200 naval mines.

Service history
Quarto was built at the Regia Marina dockyard in Venice, with her keel being laid down on 14 November 1909. Her completed hull was launched on 19 August 1911, and after fitting-out work was finished in early 1913, she was commissioned into the fleet on 31 March 1913. By 1914, Quarto was had been assigned to the 1st Division of the 1st Squadron; the squadron consisted of two divisions of armored cruisers, each supported by a scout cruiser. Quartos division also included the dreadnought battleships Dante Alighieri and two of the Conte di Cavour-class battleships.

World War I
Italy declared neutrality at the start of World War I in August 1914, but by July 1915, the Triple Entente had convinced the Italians to enter the war against the Central Powers; Italy's primary opponent in the Adriatic was the Austro-Hungarian Navy. Admiral Paolo Thaon di Revel, the Italian naval chief of staff, believed that Austro-Hungarian submarines could operate too effectively in the narrow waters of the Adriatic, which could also be easily seeded with minefields. The threat from these underwater weapons was too serious for him to use the fleet in an active way. Instead, Revel decided to implement blockade at the relatively safer southern end of the Adriatic with the main fleet, while smaller vessels, such as the MAS boats, conducted raids on Austro-Hungarian ships and installations. Quarto and the two s were based at Brindisi during the war, where the narrow Adriatic joined the Mediterranean.

During the war, enemy submarines frequently misjudged Quartos speed as a result of her very shallow draft, which produced a misleading wave pattern on the hull. The ship escaped torpedoing on numerous occasions due to this factor. In December 1915, an Austro-Hungarian force of two cruisers and five destroyers attempted to intercept transports supplying the Serbian Army trapped in Albania. Quarto, flying the flag of Rear Admiral Silvio Bellini, and the British cruiser , along with five French destroyers, sortied from Brindisi to intercept the Austro-Hungarians. ,  and four Italian destroyers followed two hours later. Quarto and Dartmouth pursued the cruiser  and fought a long-range gun battle as the Austro-Hungarian ship tried to escape. Helgoland managed to evade her pursuers after the fall of darkness and both sides returned to port. By May 1917, Bellini had been replaced by Rear Admiral Alfredo Acton. Quarto was unable to get underway to participate in the Battle of the Otranto Straits because she did not have steam up in her boilers when the Italo-British force at Brindisi learned of the Austro-Hungarian raid on the Otranto Barrage.

Postwar career

Quarto was modified in 1926–1927 to handle a Macchi M.18 seaplane. In the early 1930s, Quarto was sent to East Asian waters, where she replaced the cruiser . Quartos stay there was short lived, as she was transferred to Africa to support the Second Italo-Ethiopian War in 1935–1936. Three of her 76 mm guns were replaced with  machine guns in 1936. She thereafter served as the flagship of Rear Admiral Alberto di Moriondo, the commander of Italian warships operating off Spain with the non-intervention patrols during the Spanish Civil War. On 24 May 1937, Spanish Republican bombers nearly hit the ship while she was moored in Palma, Majorca.

The ship suffered a boiler explosion in August 1938. She remained in service for a short time longer, and she was stricken from the naval register on 5 January 1939. She was subsequently towed from La Spezia to Livorno, where her hull was used for experiments. These tests included a trial of the new SLC human torpedo, which was later used by the Decima Flottiglia MAS, in La Spezia in early 1940. In November 1940, tests with the new MT explosive motorboats with reduced charges were carried out. The MT boats were later used to sink the cruiser  at Souda Bay. The MT boat test caused significant damage to Quarto, even with the reduced explosives, and she quickly sank.

Footnotes

Notes

Citations

References

Further reading

External links
 Quarto Marina Militare website 

Cruisers of the Regia Marina
Ships built in Venice
1911 ships
Ships sunk as targets
Maritime incidents in November 1940
Ships built by Venetian Arsenal